Shahrak-e Sarab Nilufar (also Romanized as Shahrak-e Sarāb Nīlūfar) is a village in Baladarband Rural District, in the Central District of Kermanshah County, Kermanshah Province, Iran. At the 2006 census, its population was 1,018, in 249 families.

References 

Populated places in Kermanshah County